Étienne-François Gebauer (7 March 1776 – 1823) was a French composer and flautist.

Biography 
Born in Versailles, the son of a German regimental musician, Étienne-François Gebauer was the brother of Michel-Joseph Gebauer, François-René Gebauer, Pierre-Paul Gebauer and Jean-Luc Gebauer, all musicians and composers.

He began his musical studies under the direction of his elder brother Michel-Joseph Gebauer and then received a formation to flute from Antoine Hugot. He entered the orchestra of the Opera-Comique in 1801 as second flute, then became first flute in 1813, but retired in 1822 for health reasons. He died in Paris a few months later.

As a composer, he wrote many works, especially for his instrument, the flute.

Works 
 19 works of duets for 2 flutes
 several works of duets for 2 violins
 flute sonatas with bass accompaniment, Op. 8 and Op. 14
 more than 100 solos detached for solo flute, varied tunes, etc.
 gamut for flute followed by 18 arias
 varied tunes for clarinet
 3 easy duets, for flute and violin, ed. Amadeus
 12 variations on Que ne suis-je la fougère ?, for solo flute, ed. Billaudot
 Concert duo Op. 16 n° 3, for clarinet and violin, ed. Breitkopf & Härtel (Musica Rara)
 3 duets Op. 24, for 2 flutes, ed. Universal Edition
 6 easy duets Op. 4, for 2 flutes
 6 duos of an easy to use version for beginners Op. 5, for 2 flutes
 6 duos of an easy to use version for beginners Pp. 6, for 2 clarinets
 6 flute sonatas with bass accompaniment Op. 8
 6 duets Op. 9, for flute and violin
 3 concertant duos Op. 11, for 2 clarinets
 6 concertant duets Op. 16, for clarinet and violin
 6 duets Op. 20, for 2 flutes
 6 concertant duets Op. 21, for 2 flutes
 6 easy and brilliant duets Op. 24, for 2 flutes

Sources 
 François-Joseph Fétis, Biographie universelle des musiciens, volume 3, Paris, Firmin-Didot, 1866,.

External links 

18th-century French composers
18th-century male musicians
18th-century musicians
19th-century French composers
French classical flautists
1776 births
1823 deaths
People from Versailles
19th-century male musicians